Ioannis Pasiali (born November 1, 1997) is a Cypriot professional basketball player for Keravnos of the Cyprus Basketball Division 1.

Professional career
Pasiali began his career with AEK Larnaca of the Cypriot League.During his tenure with the club, he won the Cypriot League and the Cypriot Cup two times each, being mostly a bench player. The following two seasons, he played with AEL Limassol.

On July 19, 2020, Pasiali joined APOP Paphos of the Cypriot League. After averaging 12.6 points and 4.8 rebounds with APOP, on December 14, 2020, was transferred to Keravnos of the Cyprus Basketball Division 1.

Cyprus national team
Pasiali has been regularly called to Cypriot Senior National Team since 2019.

References

External links
RealGM.com Profile
Eurobasket.com Profile

1997 births
Living people
AEK Larnaca B.C. players
AEL Limassol B.C. players
Cypriot men's basketball players
Keravnos B.C. players
Shooting guards